Česlovas Vytautas Stankevičius (born 27 February 1937) is a Lithuanian politician.  In 1990 he was among those who signed the Act of the Re-Establishment of the State of Lithuania.

References
Biography

1937 births
Living people
Ministers of Defence of Lithuania
Members of the Seimas
21st-century Lithuanian politicians